Yenibosna is a station on the M1 line of the Istanbul Metro in Bakırköy, Istanbul. The station was opened on 25 July 1995 and was the western terminus of the M1 until 2002, when the line was extended towards Atatürk Airport.

Layout

References

Railway stations opened in 1995
1995 establishments in Turkey
Istanbul metro stations
Bakırköy